The Japan national under-23 football team（Japanese: U-23サッカー日本代表）is a national association football youth team of Japan and is controlled by the Japan Football Association. The team won the gold medal at the 2010 Asian Games and were champions in the 2016 AFC U-23 Championship. Since 1992, it was decided that teams targeting athletes under the age of 23 will participate in the Olympics (additional provisions for overage limits have been added since 1996). Therefore, the name changes to Japan national under-22 football team the year before the Olympics and Japan national under-21 football team
two years prior. The exception to this is the 2020 Tokyo Olympics, which has been postponed for one year, so in 2021, the team will be called the Japan national under-24 football team.

Team image

Nicknames
"サムライ・ブルー (Samurai Blue)" basically refers to the Japan national football team, but the under-23 football team are sometimes referred to as "Young" Samurai Blue. However, in reality, Samurai Blue is not often used.

Rivalries

South Korea

Japan maintains a strong football rivalry with South Korea.

Media coverage

Summer Olympics

AFC U-23 Asian Cup

Friendly and Qualifiers
 Dubai Cup U-23

Results and fixtures

Legend

2023
 Fixtures & Results (M U-22 2023), JFA.jp

2022

U-23/University 

Fixtures & Results (2022), JFA.jp

U-21 

Fixtures & Results (2022), JFA.jp

2023

U-22

Fixtures & Results (2023), JFA.jp

Head-to-head record
, after the match against .

The following table shows Japan under-23 team's all-time international record.

Coaching staff

Current coaching staff

Players

Current U-23 squad

The following players were called up for a friendly match against Cambodia on 23 September 2022.

Current U-22 squad
The following players were called up for friendly matches against Germany and Belgium, to beld on 24 and 27 March 2023, respectively.

Current U-21 squad
The following players were called up for friendly matches against Spain and Portugal on 18 and 22 November 2022, respectively.

Recent U-23, U-22, and U-21 call-ups
The following players have been called up to an under-23, under-22, or under-21 squad in the past 12 months. Each players' age and clubs are updated frequently.

INJ Withdrew due to injury
PRE Preliminary squad / standby
RET Retired from the national team
SUS Serving suspension
WD Player withdrew from the squad due to non-injury issue.
U23 Player selected for an U-23 squad
U22 Player selected for an U-22 squad
U21 Player selected for an U-21 squad

(Players are listed within position group by order of latest call-up, seniority, caps, goals, and then alphabetically)

Current University squad
The following players were called up for the Denso Cup Soccer 2023 Japan-Korea Challenge Match.

Previous squads
Bold indicates winning squads
Olympic Games
1996 Summer Olympics Squad
2000 Summer Olympics Squad
2004 Summer Olympics Squad
2008 Summer Olympics Squad
2012 Summer Olympics Squad
2016 Summer Olympics Squad
2020 Summer Olympics Squad
AFC U-23 Asian Cup
2013 AFC U-22 Championship Squad
2016 AFC U-23 Championship Squad
2018 AFC U-23 Championship Squad
2020 AFC U-23 Championship Squad
2022 AFC U-23 Asian Cup Squad
Asian Games
2002 Asian Games Squad
2006 Asian Games Squad
2010 Asian Games Squad
2014 Asian Games Squad
2018 Asian Games Squad

Overaged players in the Olympic Games

Manager history

Records

Players in bold are still active, at least at club level.
Caps and goals is calculated by all national team level include U21, U22, and U23.

Most capped players

Top goalscorers

Competitive record
 Champions   Runners-up   Third place   Fourth place

Olympic Games

Match history

AFC U-23 Asian Cup

Match history

Asian Games

Match history

See also

Sport in Japan
Football in Japan
Women's football in Japan
Japan Football Association (JFA)
Kirin Cup (Invitational tournament)
 (International friendly match)
Kirin Company

National teams
Men's
National football team
Results and fixtures
2020–present
International footballers
National under-23 football team
National under-20 football team
National under-17 football team
National futsal team
National under-20 futsal team
National beach soccer team
Women's
National football team
Results and fixtures
2021
International footballers
National under-20 football team
National under-17 football team
National futsal team

References

External links
  Japan national under-21 football team (2022) – official website at JFA.jp
  Japan national under-24 football team (2021) – official website at JFA.jp
  Japan national under-23 football team (2020) – official website at JFA.jp
  Japan national team 2021 schedule at JFA.jp

Youth football in Japan
Asian national under-23 association football teams
Football